Doubt Me Now is the debut album by American rapper Lil Wyte, released March 4, 2003. The album became an underground hit among fans, selling over 135,000 copies independently, without any promotion. Lil Wyte himself claimed that 6,200 people bought and 20,000 people downloaded the album in the first week of its release. To date it has sold 360,000 copies. Fans also consider this his best album.

Doubt Me Now was also remixed in the Chopped and screwed style by DJ Black and named Doubt Me Now: Surped Up and Screwed. The song "Ten Toes Tall" was originally from the album he made with Shelby Forest Click.

On the iTunes version of this album, the skits "Shit Faced" and "Don't Take Those" are not included, however "Death and Life" is still intact.

Track listing

Credits
All songs produced by DJ Paul & Juicy J.

Notes
On the iTunes version of this album, the skits "Shit Faced" and "Don't Take Those" are not included, however "Death and Life" is still intact.

References

 

2003 debut albums
Lil Wyte albums
Albums produced by DJ Paul
Albums produced by Juicy J